Stefanoni is an Italian surname, derived from the name Stefano.

Notable people with this surname include:
 Ivo Stefanoni (born 1936), Italian rower
 Marina Stefanoni (born 2002), American squash player
 Daniele Stefanoni (born 1966), Italian paralympic rower

Italian-language surnames
Patronymic surnames
Surnames from given names